The Pine Forest Range (also known as the Pine Forest Mountains) is a mountain range in Humboldt County, in the U.S. state of Nevada. It is north of the Black Rock Desert.

The range was so named on account of pine timber in the area.

Gallery

References 

Mountain ranges of Humboldt County, Nevada
Mountain ranges of Nevada